State Highway 6 (SH-6) is a state highway in northern Idaho running from the Washington state line near Potlatch to Santa.  in length and generally runs southwest

Route description
SH-6 begins at the Washington state line in Latah County as a continuation of Washington State Route 272, then heads east to an intersection with U.S. 95, with which it briefly overlaps before diverging and continuing east into Potlatch.   east to an intersection with SH-9 

SH-6 continues northeast and north across the Palouse River into Benewah County, generally north through White Pine Drive; and area of old-growth white pine trees in the Hoodoo Mountains in the St. Joe National Forest. It terminates at a junction with SH-3, west 

Prior to the 1960s, SH-6 was signed as an alternate route of U.S. 95, which continued north along

Major intersections

See also

 List of state highways in Idaho
 List of highways numbered 6

References

External links

 David Rumsey Map Collection – Historic road map (1937) – Idaho, Montana, Wyoming – Texaco (Rand McNally)
 Idaho highway map (1956) – Shell (H.M. Gousha)

006
Transportation in Latah County, Idaho
Transportation in Benewah County, Idaho